The Church of Saints Eusebius and Polion is a Roman Catholic church in Vinkovci, Croatia.

History 

The church was built from 1772 till 1777.

It was severely damaged during the Croatian War of Independence. On 20 November 1991, shelling by the Yugoslav People's Army and Serbian paramilitaries caused the spire to catch fire, destroying the church bells. The spire eventually completely crashed, and the pictures of its destruction became a symbol of the battle of Vukovar.

From 1994 till 1998 the church was renovated. In 1999 was completed renovation of spire.

References 

Churches in Croatia
Vinkovci
Roman Catholic churches in Vukovar-Syrmia County